The Aerospace Medical Association (AsMA) is the largest professional organization in the fields of aviation, space, and environmental medicine. The AsMA membership includes aerospace and hyperbaric medical specialists, scientists, flight nurses, physiologists, and researchers from all over the world.

Mission
The Aerospace Medical Association's mission is to raise awareness of health, safety, and performance of individuals working in aerospace-related field through application of scientific method.

History 
The AsMA was found under the guidance of Louis H. Bauer, M.D. in 1929. Bauer was the first medical director of the Aeronautics Branch of the Department of Commerce which became the Federal Aviation Administration (FAA). The original 29 "aeromedical examiners" started the organization for the "dissemination of information, as it will enhance the accuracy of their specialized art...thereby affording a greater guarantee for the  safety of the public and the pilot, alike; and to cooperate... in furthering the progress of aeronautics in the United States." Hubertus Strughold, the "Father of Space Medicine", co-founded of the Space Medicine Branch of the AsMA in 1950.

Membership 
The AsMA has more than 2,000 members, approximately 30% of the membership is international from over 70 countries.

Publications 
The AsMA produces many publications including:
 Aerospace Medicine and Human Performance - A peer reviewed monthly publication that was first published in 2015 and is indexed in PubMed. (ISSN 2375-6314) 
 Aviation, Space, and Environmental Medicine - A peer reviewed monthly publication that was published from 1975 to 2015 and is indexed in PubMed.
 Aerospace medicine - The preceding journal to Aviation, Space, and Environmental Medicine was published from 1959 to 1974.
 The Journal of Aviation Medicine - The preceding journal to Aerospace medicine was published from 1930 to 1959.
 Medical Guidelines for Airline Passengers
 Medical Guidelines for Airline Travel

See also

References

External resources 
 AsMA Homepage
 Aviation, Space, and Environmental Medicine Journal - Volume 74, Number 1, January 2003 to current

Aviation medicine organizations
Diving medicine
Non-profit organizations based in Alexandria, Virginia
Organizations established in 1929
1929 establishments in the United States
Space medicine
Medical associations based in the United States
Medical and health organizations based in Virginia